Burn is the third studio album by Sister Machine Gun, released on October 24, 1995 by TVT and Wax Trax! Records. The album peaked at #9 on the CMJ Radio Top 200.

Reception

Vincent Jeffries of allmusic gave Burn a two out of five stars, saying "the depth and complexity of the mixes confirm a modicum of growth for the singer/guitarist/programmer."

Track listing

Notes
 Burn has two hidden tracks on the CD release. The first is a cover of The Doors, "Strange Days" which is found by rewinding the CD to -4:20 on a CD player (this may not work on software media players).  The second is a reprise of the song "Inside" found at 8:43 on the final track.
 The title track was part of the soundtrack of the 1995 film adaptation of Mortal Kombat.

Personnel
Adapted from the Burn liner notes.

Sister Machine Gun
 Chris Randall – lead vocals, keyboards, programming, production, recording, mixing

Additional performers
 Dan Agne – effects, recording technician, backing vocals (5)
 Bob Jones – bass guitar
 Chris Kelly – backing vocals (3)
 Wolf Larson – saxophone
 Geno Lenardo – guitar
 Jim Marcus – additional programming
 Jason McNinch – guitar, effects, recording, mixing
 Chris Smits – guitar
 Mars Williams – saxophone

Production and design
 Van Christie – recording, mixing, additional production (4, 7, 8, 10)
 John Fryer – recording, mixing, additional production (1-3, 5, 6, 9)
 James Loughrey – recording technician
 Michael D. Ryan – management
 Zack F. Seaman – photography, design
 Mique Willmott – cover art, design, illustrations
 Stephen Yates – recording technician

Release history

References

External links 
 
 

1995 albums
Sister Machine Gun albums
TVT Records albums
Wax Trax! Records albums